Events in the year 1879 in Argentina.

Incumbents
 President: Nicolás Avellaneda
 Vice President: Mariano Acosta

Governors
 Buenos Aires Province: Carlos Tejedor 
 Cordoba: Antonio Del Viso 
 Mendoza Province: Elías Villanueva
 Santa Fe Province: Simón de Iriondo

Vice Governors
Buenos Aires Province: José María Moreno

Events
April – Conquest of the Desert: Julio Argentino Roca begins his second sweep of the land up to the Río Negro, aiming to "extinguish, subdue or expel" the Indians who inhabit the region. 
October – Roca gives up his military career to enter politics.
10 November – Tandanor, a worker-owned shipyard, is founded in Buenos Aires. 
date unknown 
Argentina's first anarchist newspaper, El Descamisado, is launched.
Aberdeen Angus cattle are first introduced to Argentina by Don Carlos Guerrero.

Arts and culture
date unknown 
José Hernández publishes La Vuelta de Martín Fierro, the second and final part of his epic poem. 
Eduardo Gutiérrez writes his major novel, Juan Moreira.

Births
27 May – Cesáreo Bernaldo de Quirós, post-Impressionist painter (died 1968) 
22 November – Julio Salvador Sagreras, guitarist and composer (died 1942)
6 December – Rogelio Yrurtia, Realist sculptor (died 1950)

Deaths
date unknown – Juan Madariaga, general (born 1809)

References

 
History of Argentina (1852–1880)
Years of the 19th century in Argentina